The United African University of Tanzania (UAUT) is  a private Christian university in Tanzania. It was founded by the Korea Church Mission  and is located in Dar es Salaam.

References

External links
 

Private universities in Tanzania
Universities in Dar es Salaam
Educational institutions established in 2012
2012 establishments in Tanzania